José María Junior Moreno Huaca (born 19 January 1997) is a Colombian professional footballer.

References

External links
 

1997 births
Living people
Colombian footballers
Colombian expatriate footballers
Association football midfielders
Querétaro F.C. footballers
Cimarrones de Sonora players
Fortaleza C.E.I.F. footballers
Ascenso MX players
Categoría Primera B players
Colombian expatriate sportspeople in Mexico
Expatriate footballers in Mexico
People from La Guajira Department